George Kweku Davies (born 16 November 1996) is a Sierra Leonean footballer who plays for Austrian Football Second League club SKN St. Pölten as a left midfielder.

Club career
Davies has played youth football in Sierra Leone, Ghana and England for FC Johansen, Right to Dream Academy and Manchester City.

Davies joined the youth team of German club Greuther Fürth in August 2014. In November 2014 he signed a professional contract with them which runs until June 2019. Davies made his first team league debut for the club on 16 December 2014 as a 71st-minute substitute in a 0-0 draw with VfL Bochum.

In January 2017 Davies joined the Austrian club Floridsdorfer AC on loan. On 19 July 2017, he joined SKN St. Pölten.

International career
After receiving his first call up to the Sierra Leone national team in August 2012, Davies made his senior international debut in 2013.

References

1996 births
Living people
Sierra Leonean footballers
Sierra Leone international footballers
FC Johansen players
Right to Dream Academy players
Manchester City F.C. players
SpVgg Greuther Fürth players
Floridsdorfer AC players
SKN St. Pölten players
Riga FC players
2. Bundesliga players
Austrian Football Bundesliga players
2. Liga (Austria) players
Latvian Higher League players
Sierra Leonean expatriate footballers
Expatriate footballers in Ghana
Sierra Leonean expatriate sportspeople in Ghana
Expatriate footballers in England
Sierra Leonean expatriate sportspeople in the United Kingdom
Expatriate footballers in Germany
Sierra Leonean expatriate sportspeople in Germany
Expatriate footballers in Austria
Sierra Leonean expatriate sportspeople in Austria
Expatriate footballers in Latvia
Sportspeople from Freetown
Association football wingers